Awesome Magical Tales (also known as Teenage Fairytale Dropouts in the first season) is an animated series created by Adolfo Martinez Vara and José C. Garcia de Letona. Inspired by the characters from the 2003 Mexican animated film, Magos y Gigantes, the series was created and produced by Ánima Estudios and co-produced with SLR Productions, Home Plate Entertainment, Telegael Teoranta and Agogo Media. It made its first introduction on Seven Network in Australia on 31 December 2012. In Mexico, the show premiered on digital and streaming platforms, dubbed as Generación Fairytale.

The show later premiered in the U.S. on the Hub Network on 31 May 2014.

Ánima Estudios has launched an official YouTube channel for the Spanish-language version of the show on 7 May 2015, with an English-language version being launched a week later on 14 May 2015.

The show has been recently acquired by Bejuba! Entertainment for new distribution rights and was renamed Awesome Magical Tales. The show has also been renewed for a second season by Australia's ABC Me after successful ratings during its domestic broadcast.

Synopsis
Set in a fairy tale-like setting, three friends, Jeremiah, the son of the giant in Jack and the Beanstalk, Trafalgar, the nephew of Merlin the Wizard, a wingless fairy named Fury, the daughter of Tooth Fairy, live through a tough life as teenagers and are determined to be themselves, despite their parents' whim and their fairy tale origins.

Cast

Main cast
 Simon Kennedy as Jeremiah, the son of the Giant from 'Jack and the Beanstalk', who is not a giant himself.
 John Hasler as Trafalgar, the nephew of Merlin the Wizard, who is incorrectly cast spells.
 Katherine Cohn Beck as Fury, the wingless daughter of Tooth Fairy.
 Nigel Pilkington as Jimmy Rella, Evil Earl, Chuck Charming
 Dan Russell as Magic Mirror, Merlin, Pinocchio, Jr.
 Emma Tate as Mother Goose, Fairy Godmother, Melody

Guest stars
 Melissa Rauch as Miss Fiendish

Production
On 28 September 2011, Ánima Estudios has announced an international partnership with SLR Productions, Home Plate Entertainment, Telegael Teoranta and Agogo Media and have green-lighted the show. "We’re thrilled to have such extraordinary partners on board for this series. I think what has really brought us together is a love for our quirky main characters," said Jose Carlos Garcia de Letona, Ánima Estudios’ executive VP. "Aussie kids will connect with the series – it is fun and quirky. It is a fresh spin on timeless classic characters.", said Suzanne Ryan, CEO of SLR Productions. According to Fernando de Fuentes, the series' producer, he stated that while the series originated in Mexico, it is designed for an English-language audience.

This show is based on the character profiles from Ánima Estudios' first film, Wizards and Giants, according to series' creator José C. García de Letona. "History comes, somehow, [from] our first movie, Wizards and Giants, but already very distantly," he said. "It follows some of the references and character profiles, but some things change radically." He also said that 70% of the show's production is taken place in Mexico, while the rest is taken place in other countries.

On 7 April 2013, Canadian entertainment company CCI Entertainment has acquired distribution rights to the series and has landed new sales on 9 December 2013.

On 16 October 2017, Bejuba! Entertainment has acquired new distribution rights to the series, being renamed as Awesome Magical Tales. The show has also been renewed by ABC Me for a new season. However the second season is currently in Development hell

U.S. broadcasting
On 28 April 2014, the Hub Network acquired the U.S. rights to the show and was broadcast on 31 May 2014. This marked a milestone for the Mexican animation industry, as the first time a major U.S. cable network transmitted a Latin American-produced animated television production for its line-up, as the series was primarily produced in Mexico. According to the Ánima Estudios executives, it nearly took nearly two years for the show to enter the U.S. market. This also marked history for the studio, as this was the first time they entered a major U.S. market. After Hub's relaunching as Discovery Family, the show has been pulled from its air lineup.

Reception
The show has received favorable reviews. Emily Ashby of Common Sense Media gave the show 4 out of 5 stars and wrote, "Teenage Fairytale Dropouts delivers some really admirable messages through three teen characters who are floundering their way through growing up. Sure, it has fun with the fact that Fury's still waiting to "develop" her wings and Jeremiah's small stature is almost comical given his genetic giantism, but the ultimately none of these issues puts a dent in the teens' solid self-esteem. What's more, while each story puts the characters in a rebellious situation of some kind (borrowing the family's golden goose without permission or misusing magic, for instance), there's always an obvious consequence and some positive lesson to be learned from the experience."

Episodes

Season 1 (2012-2013) 

 Nice Giants Finish Last / Winged Fury
 Triple Double Trouble / Mascot Madness 
 Good Fairy of the Year / Mis-Spelled Rat
 Grimm Gossips / Once Upon a Stompapalootza
 All Booked Up / Abraca-Dad-Bra
 Rebel Without a Lederhosen / Something Wicked This Way Substitutes
 Who's the Best Actress of Them All? / Here Today, Wand Tomorrow
 Pie Way or the Highway / Substitute Tooth Fairy
 It's No Lie / How to Restrain Your Dragon
 Lunch Table of the Misfit Fairytales / Lack of Hocus Pocus
 A Giant Sized Ego / Only Slime Will Tell
 Golden Goose Chase / Camp Stomp-a-Lot
 My Cousin Myron / Not So Adorabella
 Ye Olde Face Scroll Blues / A String of Promises
 Splank’d / A Rotten Job
 Court Ordered Magician / A Very Big Wish
 Keeping Up With the Arthurians / Disenchanted Forest
 The Boy Who Cried Ogre / Joust in Time
 Bad Conrad / Fairytale Estates’ Got Talent
 Happily Ever After Day / Unhappy Birthdays
 Giant Competition / Jack and the Beanstalks
 Ca-Stache-Trophy / Sayer It Ain’t So
 A Nose For Trouble / A Brand New Happy Ending
 The Tell Tale Report Card / Party On
 Pet Project / Get to the Point
 Just the Three of Us / A Grimm Story

Broadcast
Teenage Fairytale Dropouts is broadcast on Seven Network, ABC1, and ABC Me in Australia, HBO Asia and HBO Family Asia in Singapore, Sun Network in India, and Discovery Family (formerly Hub Network) in the U.S.

In Mexico, it was released exclusively on digital platforms, such as Amazon Prime Video.

References

External links
Official website
 
Awesome Magical Tales on Bejuba! Entertainment
Awesome Magical Tales on SLR Productions
Teenage Fairytale Dropouts (Awesome Magical Tales) on Home Plate Entertainment
Teenage Fairytale Dropouts (Awesome Magical Tales) on Telegael

2010s American animated television series
2010s Australian animated television series
2010s Mexican television series
2012 American television series debuts
2013 American television series endings
2012 Australian television series debuts
2013 Australian television series endings
2012 Irish television series debuts
2013 Irish television series endings
2012 Mexican television series debuts
2013 Mexican television series endings
American children's animated comedy television series
American children's animated fantasy television series
American flash animated television series
Australian children's animated comedy television series
Australian children's animated fantasy television series
Australian flash animated television series
Irish children's animated comedy television series
Irish children's animated fantasy television series
Irish flash animated television series
Mexican children's animated comedy television series
Mexican children's animated fantasy television series
Mexican flash animated television series
English-language television shows
Ánima Estudios television series
7two original programming